John Vernon Lord is an illustrator, author and teacher. He has illustrated texts including Aesop's Fables,The Nonsense Verse of Edward Lear; the Folio Society's Myths and Legends of the British Isles, and   He has illustrated classics of English literature including the work of Lewis Carroll and James Joyce.
Lord has written and illustrated several children's books, which have been published and translated into several languages. 
His book The Giant Jam Sandwich has been in print since 1972

He was head of various departments, including the Head of the School of Design,
at Brighton Art School, Polytechnic and University. He was Professor of Illustration at the University of Brighton 1986-99, where he is now Professor Emeritus. An Honorary D.Litt. was conferred upon him by the University of Brighton in 2000.

He was the chair of the Graphic Design Board of the Council for National Academic Awards 1981-84.

Background and education

John Vernon Lord was born in 1939 in Glossop, Derbyshire. He was the son of a baker and a ship's hairdresser. He attended Salford School of Art, now the University of Salford in Lancashire (1956–60); and completed his formal education at the Central School of Arts and Crafts in London, where he was taught by the modernist writer and artist Mervyn Peake and the surrealist Cecil Collins, amongst others. In his recent retrospective, Drawing Upon Drawing he states that,
"During (his) student days, in the late 1950s the work of Gerard Hoffnung, André François, Ronald Searle and Saul Steinberg...and, to a certain extent..the work of Paul Klee"
were also influential, as was "an abiding interest" in Victorian steel engraving.

Drawing for a living
In 1961, Lord began work as a freelance illustrator, joining the agents Saxon Artists, in New Oxford Street, London. This required him to draw on demand, day in and out, often for long hours. He described the difference between life as an art student and life as a professional illustrator in the following terms:

As well as drawing the insides of stomachs, I tackled everything that came my way.  I carried out portraits of company directors for their retirement dinner menu covers, buildings for brochures, strip cartoons, maps and humorous drawings for advertisements....gardens and their plants, vegetables, mazes, refrigerators, dishwashers, totem poles, kitchen utensils, resuscitation diagrams, all kinds of furniture, typewriters, agricultural crop spraying machines, door locks, folded towels, decorative letters, Zodiac signs, animals....When you are a student there is a tendency at first to limit yourself to draw only what you like drawing.  This of course ultimately shackles you and limits your repertoire ...(it) narrows the margin of what you are able to depict in an image and consequently stifles imagination and ideas.

As a commercial artist, in 1968 Lord designed the album cover for The Book of Taliesyn by the band Deep Purple. The brief from the artist's agent is detailed in Drawing upon Drawing as follows:
"the agent gave me the title saying that the art director wanted a 'fantasy Arthurian touch' and to include hand lettering for the title and the musicians' names. I mainly drew from The Book of Taliesin, which is a collection of poems, said to be written by the sixth century Welsh bard Taliesin."[3]

Brighton
In 1968, Lord became a teacher at Brighton College of Art (now the Faculty of Arts). He concentrated on the illustration of books. He was commissioned to illustrate the Adventures of Jabotí on the Amazon and Reynard the Fox and so began a love affair with narrative illustration. During the 1970s, while a teacher at Brighton, he wrote The Giant Jam Sandwich, The Runaway Roller Skate and Mr Mead and his Garden, and illustrated Conrad Aiken's Who's Zoo Lord produced several illustrations for Punch and the Radio Times. He wrote articles and gave public lectures on illustration as an art form. He began to work in black and white. In an article on cross hatching Lord writes:

"The whiteness of the paper already exists before you proceed to draw. It has established itself as a fundamental entity; a ground to tread on. What marks you make on the paper are as important as the marks you don't make; or is the opposite the case? The editing and selection of gap-making is fundamental to drawing. Nothingness, therefore, allows something else to exist. Planets move in space. Planets need space to move about in. Space doesn't need planets. The pencil (or whatever other drawing instrument you are using) clothes the naked surface of the paper with a network of marks and the paper often peeps through the drawing. A picture is made up of a balancing between the making, the removing, and the not-making of marks. Somehow a drawing represents the trails of a journey like, as Klee put it – 'taking a line for a walk', which is a far more conducive activity than taking a dog for a walk."

In 1986, he was appointed Professor of Illustration at University of Brighton and his inaugural lecture Illustrating Lear's Nonsense was published a few years later. Robert Mason reviewing Lord's lecture A Journey of Drawing An Illustration of a Fable writes:

Lord's fastidious verbal dissection of the process of making a single pen and ink illustration, The Crow And The Sheep, over a period of 11 hours and 11 minutes on the 10th and 11th of February 1985, was intimate and unique. Its very length, and its combination of intense focus interspersed with frequent digressions – about how to avoid actually working, the tendency of Rotring pens to clog, contemporary news topics (mortgage rate increases / African famines / American defence spending…) and the maximum and minimum temperatures of the days in question (minus 3 and minus 7 degrees Fahrenheit) made the audience feel at one with the process..."

Gallery

Selected publications as an illustrator
1965	A Visit to Bedsyde Manor, by Stanley Penn, Guinness Publications.
1968 	Adventures of Jabotí on the Amazon, by Lena F. Hurlong, Abelard-Schuman.
1969 	Reynard the Fox, by Roy Brown, Abelard-Schuman.
1970	A Natural History of Man, by J.K. Brierley, Heinemann.
1970 	The Truck on the Track, by Janet Burroway, Jonathan Cape.
1970 	Dinosaurs Don't Die, by Ann Coates, Longman.
1972 	The Adventures of Brer Rabbit, after Joel Chandler Harris, BBC Jackanory.
1975	Sword at Sunset, by Rosemary Sutcliff, (Edito-Service), Geneva.
1977 	Who's Zoo, poems by Conrad Aiken, Jonathan Cape.
1984	The Nonsense Verse of Edward Lear, Jonathan Cape.
1989 	The Song that Sings the Bird, poems chosen by Ruth Craft and illustrated by JVL, Collins.
1989 	Aesop's Fables, verses by James Michie, Jonathan Cape.
1994	The Squirrel and the Crow, by Wendy Cope,  'Prospero Poets' series for the Clarion Press.
1995	King Arthur's Knights, by Henry Gilbert, Macmillan.
1998	Myths and Legends of the British Isles, edited by Richard Barber, The Folio Society.
2002	Icelandic Sagas, Volume 2, translated by Magnus Magnusson, The Folio Society.
2005	Epics of the Middle Ages, edited by Richard Barber, The Folio Society.
2006	The Hunting of the Snark, by Lewis Carroll, Artists' Choice Editions, The Foundry, Church Hanborough.
2009	Alice's Adventures in Wonderland, by Lewis Carroll, Artists' Choice Editions.
2011 Through the Looking-Glass and What Alice Found There, by Lewis Carroll, Artists' Choice Editions
2014 Finnegans Wake, by James Joyce, The Folio Society
2017 Ulysses, by James Joyce, The Folio Society
2020 Wagner’s Ring of the Nibelung: A Companion, English translation by Stewart Spencer, The Folio Society

Books
1972, The Giant Jam Sandwich, set to verse by Janet Burroway, Jonathan Cape.
1973, The Runaway Roller Skate, Jonathan Cape.
1974, Mr Mead and his Garden, Jonathan Cape.
1979, Miserable Aunt Bertha, set to verse by Fay Maschler, Jonathan Cape.
1986, The Doodles and Diaries of John Vernon Lord, Camberwell Press.
2007, Drawing Upon Drawing: 50 Years of Illustrating, University of Brighton.
2009, John's Journal Jottings, Inky Parrott Press.
2014, Drawn to Drawing, by John Vernon Lord, Nobrow Press

Awards
In 1985 his The Nonsense Verse of Edward Lear won the ‘Redwood Burn Award’ sponsored by the NBL and Publishers’ Association; and it also won the ‘General Selectors’ Award’ by the British Federation of Master Printers.
In 1990 his illustrations for Aesop’s Fables won the overall prize in the ‘V&A/W.H Smith Illustration Awards’.
In 2018 his illustrations for Ulysses won the ‘V&A Illustration Award for Book Illustration’ and the winner of the ‘2018 Moira Gemmill Illustrator of the Year Prize’.

References

External links
 The Journal of the Association of Illustrators
 Four Generations of Illustrators

Links to lectures and articles
 The Giant Jam Sandwich: a Lecture
 Teaching Illustration
 A Journey Of Drawing an Illustration of a Fable
 Narrative Music
 A Collection of Lectures
 John Vernon Lord on Illustrating Ulysses The Folio Society 16 May 2016
In Conversation with John Vernon Lord 9 January 2017
Drawn to Drawing by John Vernon Lord 3 March 2015

1939 births
Living people
English writers
British illustrators
Alumni of the University of Salford
Academics of the University of Brighton
Alumni of the Central School of Art and Design
English male writers